The 2022 Gamba Osaka season was the club's 42nd season in existence and the ninth consecutive season in the top flight of Japanese football. In addition to the domestic league, Gamba Osaka participated in this season's editions of the Emperor's Cup and the J.League Cup.

Players

First-team squad

 

DSP

Type 2
Type 2
Type 2

Type 2

Out on loan

Pre-season and friendlies

Competitions

Overall record

J1 League

League table

Results summary

Results by round

Matches 
The league fixtures were announced on 21 January 2022.

Emperor's Cup

J.League Cup

Group stage

Goalscorers

References

External links
 Official website 

Gamba Osaka seasons
Gamba Osaka